Australia competed at the 1968 Winter Olympics in Grenoble, France.
Three athletes were sent, and Australia competed in alpine skiing, cross-country skiing, and speed skating.

Malcolm Milne, brother of Ross Milne, who died while practising for the 1964 Winter Olympics, represented Australia in alpine skiing. He gained the best results for Australia in that Olympics, and one of the best slalom results ever for any Australian male.

This was the first of six Olympics for speed skater Colin Coates.

Alpine skiing

Men

Cross-country skiing

Men

Speed skating

See also
Australia at the Winter Olympics

References

External links 
Australia NOC
Olympic Winter Institute of Australia
"Australians at the Olympics: A definitive history" by Gary Lester  (suspected errata listed in Errata/0949853054)
"2002 Australian Winter Olympic Team Guide" PDF file
"The Compendium: Official Australian Olympic Statistics 1896-2002" Australian Olympic Committee  (Inconsistencies in sources mentioned in Wikibooks:Errata/0702234257)

Nations at the 1968 Winter Olympics
1968 Winter Olympics
Winter sports in Australia
1968 in Australian sport